William John O'Grady (died c. August 18, 1840) was an Irish Catholic priest and journalist in Upper Canada. He served as chaplain to Connell James Baldwin's soldiers in Brazil, and followed him to Toronto Gore Township in 1828. From January 1829 he was pastor of St. Paul's church in York.

He died at Whitby in 1840.

References

Curtis Fahey (2000) "William John O'Grady" in Dictionary of Canadian Biography Online

1840 deaths
19th-century Irish Roman Catholic priests
Irish emigrants to pre-Confederation Ontario
Year of birth missing
Canadian military chaplains